Scenedra umbrosalis is a species of snout moth in the genus Scenedra. It was described by Wileman in 1911. It is found in Japan, the Russian Far East.

The wingspan is 15–22 mm.

References

Moths described in 1911
Pyralini
Moths of Japan